Agnès Soral (born 8 June 1960) is a Franco-Swiss actress, comedian and writer.

Early life
Her family settled in Meudon in the 1960s before the expropriation by the state of forest land owned by her father, who works as a legal adviser.

Personal life
The family settled in Grenoble. She is the younger sister of essayist Alain Soral. She avoided him for years and in January 2014, denounced his political positions to the press and television. When her brother began his writing career, Agnès Soral authorized him to use her notoriety by appropriating her pseudonym, something she since regretted.

Theatre

Filmography

References

External links

1960 births
Living people
People from Aix-les-Bains
French film actresses
20th-century French actresses
21st-century French actresses